Valerie Capers (born May 24, 1935) is an American pianist and composer who is most well known for her contributions in jazz.

Early life 
Capers was born in New York City to a musical family that introduced her to classical and jazz music. Her father was a professional jazz pianist who was friends with Fats Waller, and her brother Bobby later played tenor sax and flute with Mongo Santamaria’s Afro-Cuban band.

Capers has been blind since the age of six, when an illness deprived her of her sight. Her early schooling took place at the New York Institute for the Education of the Blind, where she studied classical piano with Elizabeth Thode. Thode taught Capers to read Braille music notation; Capers had to learn all of her pieces by memorizing them in Braille before playing them. With Thorpe’s encouragement, Capers continued to study at the Juilliard School of Music, where she obtained her bachelor’s and master’s degrees. She was the first blind graduate of the Juilliard School.

Career 
Upon graduating from Juilliard in 1960, Capers was encouraged by her brother Bobby to study jazz. Bobby was also an impetus for Capers to start composing, as he asked her to compose pieces for his band. Capers took time off from playing classical music in the early 1960s in order to learn jazz. Capers formed her own trio and in 1966 recorded her first jazz album, Portrait in Soul.

Capers found it difficult to find teaching jobs in the 1960s because many institutions were unwilling to hire a blind person. She eventually was hired at the Bronx Neighborhood Music School and the Brooklyn School of Music. From 1968-1975 she worked at the Manhattan School of Music, where she was an advisor to blind students and developed a jazz curriculum. Capers was the chair of the Bronx Community College music department from 1987-1995.

Following her brother Bobby’s death in 1974, Capers composed the two hour Christmas cantata Sing About Love, which adheres to no particular genre but incorporates elements from jazz, gospel, blues, and classical. Other significant works by Capers include Song of the Seasons, a song cycle largely composed in the classical idiom, and Sojourner, an “operatorio” (a combination of opera and oratorio, term coined by Capers) about the life of Sojourner Truth.

In 2000, Oxford University Press (OUP) published a book of Capers's intermediate jazz piano compositions entitled Portraits in Jazz. Capers composed these pieces so that piano students who were being trained classically could be exposed to jazz.

Discography

References

External links
 Official site

American women jazz musicians
American jazz pianists
American jazz composers
Women jazz composers
African-American women composers
American women composers
African-American composers
Women jazz pianists
1935 births
Living people
Blind musicians
Jazz musicians from New York (state)
Musicians from New York City
Atlantic Records artists
Juilliard School alumni
20th-century jazz composers
21st-century jazz composers
20th-century American pianists
21st-century American pianists
20th-century American composers
20th-century American women pianists
21st-century American women pianists
Bronx Community College faculty
20th-century women composers
21st-century women composers
African-American pianists
African-American women musicians
20th-century African-American women
20th-century African-American people
20th-century African-American musicians
21st-century African-American women
21st-century African-American musicians